Fan Qunxiao (born 18 September 1987) is a professional Chinese footballer who plays for Yunnan Kunlu in the China League Two.

Club career 

Fan Qunxiao would start his professional football career with top tier club Shanghai United in the 2006 Chinese Super League season. In 2007 Shanghai United would merge with another top tier club in Shanghai Shenhua, which saw Shenhua keep their name. In the following two years, Fan was being loaned out to Shaanxi Neo-China and Shanghai Pudong before briefly returning to Shanghai Shenhua in 2009, but he did not feature any matches.

After being unable to break into the Shenhua team Fan was close to joining Changchun Yatai in 2011 but instead on 1 September 2011, Hong Kong First Division League side TSW Pegasus announced that Fan joined the club. He was released by TSW Pegasus in January 2012. Fan returned to mainland China and signed a contract with China League One side Guangdong Sunray Cave in March 2012.

On 28 February 2019, Fan transferred to League Two side Yunnan Kunlu.

Career statistics
Statistics accurate as of match played 31 December 2020.

References

External links

1989 births
Living people
Chinese footballers
Shanghai Shenhua F.C. players
Beijing Renhe F.C. players
TSW Pegasus FC players
Guangdong Sunray Cave players
Jiangxi Beidamen F.C. players
Chinese Super League players
China League One players
Association football central defenders